David Adam Smith (born June 15, 1965) is an American politician and retired attorney serving as the U.S. representative for . A member of the Democratic Party, Smith previously served in the Washington State Senate.

A graduate of the University of Washington School of Law, Smith briefly worked as a prosecutor and pro tem judge for the city of Seattle before entering politics. Smith was elected to the State Senate in 1990; at age 25, he was the youngest state senator in the country. He ran in and won his first congressional race in 1996, and has been reelected 11 times. Since 2019, he has chaired the House Armed Services Committee. Smith is a member of the New Democrat Coalition and the Congressional Progressive Caucus. He is the dean of Washington's House delegation.

Early life and education
Born in Washington, D.C. and raised in SeaTac, Washington, Smith was adopted as an infant by Lelia June (née Grant) and his maternal uncle Ben Martin Smith III. He attended Bow Lake Elementary and Chinook Middle School before graduating from Tyee High School in 1983. In high school, Smith participated in the Close Up Washington civic education program. His father, who worked for United Airlines as a ramp serviceman and was active in the Machinists' Union, died when Smith was 19.

Smith attended Western Washington University in Bellingham for a year before graduating from Fordham University in 1987 with a Bachelor of Arts degree in political science. He completed a Juris Doctor from the University of Washington in 1990. He worked his way through college by loading trucks for United Parcel Service.

Early career 
After law school, Smith worked as a private practice attorney with Cromwell, Mendoza & Belur. From 1993 to 1995, he served as a prosecutor for the city of Seattle. In 1996, he worked temporarily as a pro tem judge.

U.S. House of Representatives

Tenure 
Smith served in the Washington State Senate from 1991 to 1997. He was 25 years old at the time of his election in 1990, defeating a 13-year incumbent Republican, Eleanor Lee, to become the nation's youngest state senator. Smith won his seat in the U.S. House of Representatives in 1996 by defeating another incumbent Republican, Randy Tate. Smith has been reelected 12 times since without serious opposition, as what was originally drawn as a "fair fight" district turned into a fairly safe Democratic seat.

For his first seven terms, Smith represented a district that straddled Interstate 5, from Renton through Tacoma to just outside of Olympia. Smith's district was significantly redrawn after the 2010 census. It absorbed much of southeast Seattle as well as most of the Eastside. As a result, it became the state's first with a majority of residents who are racial or ethnic minorities. It is also the state's second-most Democratic district; only the neighboring 7th district, which covers the rest of Seattle, is more Democratic. For the 2012 election, Smith moved from his longtime home in Tacoma to Bellevue.

Smith has been a leader in moderate "New Democrats" organizations. He chairs the political action committee of the New Democrat Coalition.

On October 10, 2002, Smith was among the 81 Democratic members of the House to vote to authorizing the invasion of Iraq. In March 2012, he said that U.S. troops had done "amazing work" in Afghanistan and that it was "time to bring the troops home".

In 2006, Smith won his sixth term in Congress against Republican Steve Cofchin, with 65.7% of the vote to Cofchin's 34.3%.

In April 2007, Smith supported Barack Obama in the 2008 U.S. presidential election. He also appeared on Hardball with Chris Matthews speaking for Obama. The same year, he also appeared on The Colbert Report, in the show's 434-part series known as "Better Know A District".

Smith voted against the Protect America Act of 2007, which has been criticized for violating Americans' civil liberties by allowing wiretapping without issued warrants. But in 2008, he voted for a similar bill, the FISA Amendment Act of 2008 (FAA), reauthorizing many of the provisions in the expired Protect America Act, leading critics like the ACLU to call it "an unconstitutional bill that would significantly modify the Foreign Intelligence Surveillance Act", granting expansive new monitoring powers to the executive branch with very little court oversight. The FAA also ensured the dismissal of all pending cases against telecommunication companies for their previous illegal spying on American citizens on behalf of the Executive Branch. Smith also voted for the 2001 Patriot Act and to extend the Bush administration's warrantless wiretapping program.

In 2008, Smith won a seventh term in the House, defeating James Postma, a 74-year-old retired engineer running on a pro-nuclear power platform, with 65% of the vote.

On December 16, 2010, Smith defeated Silvestre Reyes and Loretta Sanchez to become the Ranking Member of the House Armed Services Committee after Chairman Ike Skelton was defeated for reelection. In the first round, Sanchez and Smith earned 64 votes with Reyes earning 53. In the runoff, Smith defeated Sanchez by 11 votes.

In 2011, recognized for his work in fighting global poverty, Smith became only the second member of Congress selected for the Borgen Project's board of directors. The same year, he argued against cuts that could "jeopardize our national security" and leave the U.S. "more vulnerable to nuclear terrorism".

In 2001, Congress passed the Authorization for Use of Military Force (AUMF), which gave the president authority to use "all necessary and appropriate force" against those who committed and aided the September 11 attacks. While this power has been rarely used to detain persons in the U.S., Smith introduced a bill to ensure that anyone detained on U.S. soil under the AUMF has access to due process and the federal court system. The bill also prohibits military commissions and indefinite detention for people detained in the U.S. and affirms that any trial proceedings "shall have all the due process as provided for under the Constitution".

Smith and Representative Mac Thornberry co-sponsored an amendment to the fiscal 2013 defense spending bill reversing previous bans on disseminating Defense and State Department propaganda in the U.S., reversing the Smith–Mundt Act of 1948 and the Foreign Relations Authorization Act of 1987, designed to protect U.S. audiences from government misinformation campaigns. The bill passed on May 18, 2012, 299 to 120.

Issues
 Smith voted to approve the invasion of Iraq.
 Smith voted to approve the Cyber Intelligence Sharing and Protection Act (CISPA)
 Smith co-sponsored the Smith–Mundt Modernization Act of 2012, which allowed domestic dissemination of U.S. propaganda.
 Smith voted against an amendment that would restrict the National Security Agency from collecting phone records of Americans suspected of no crimes without a warrant.

Committee assignments
 Committee on Armed Services (Ranking Member)

Caucus memberships
 21st Century Healthcare Caucus
 American Sikh Congressional Caucus
 European Union Caucus
 Goods Movement Caucus
 Intellectual Property Caucus (Co-Chair)
United States Congressional International Conservation Caucus
 Waterways Caucus
New Democrat Coalition
Congressional Progressive Caucus
Congressional Arts Caucus
 Afterschool Caucuses
 Congressional Asian Pacific American Caucus
U.S.-Japan Caucus
Medicare for All Caucus

Personal life 
In 1993, Smith married Spokane native Sara Bickle-Eldridge, a graduate of the University of Washington and Seattle University School of Law. Their daughter, Kendall, was born in July 2000, followed by their son, Jack, in June 2003.

See also

 2006 United States House of Representatives elections in Washington

References

Sources
 The Almanac of American Politics 2004. Washington, D.C.: National Journal, 2003.
 Pierce County Official Local Voters' Pamphlet (Pierce County Auditor, 2012).

External links

 Congressman Adam Smith official U.S. House website
 Adam Smith for Congress
 

 

|-

|-

|-

1965 births
Living people
20th-century American lawyers
20th-century American politicians
21st-century American politicians
American adoptees
American prosecutors
Democratic Party members of the United States House of Representatives from Washington (state)
Fordham University alumni
People from SeaTac, Washington
Politicians from Tacoma, Washington
University of Washington School of Law alumni
Democratic Party Washington (state) state senators